The Mariental Reformed Church is a congregation of the Reformed Churches in South Africa (GKSA) with its seat in the city of Mariental, Namibia, but the congregation members also hail from the towns of Kalkrand, Maltahöhe, Stampriet and Gochas. The congregation was founded in 1966, the same year as the Karasburg Reformed Church, and as of 2015 was the eleventh oldest GKSA congregation in Namibia.

Initially, southern South West Africa (SWA) was sparsely populated, and the Mariental and Karasburg districts were nested under a congregation headquartered in Keetmanshoop, the capital of the south. On February 27, 1932, the Rev. H.F.V. Kruger founded the Keetmanshoop district, which was raised to a full-fledged congregation on June 28, 1936 as the Keetmanshoop Reformed Church. On March 25, 1950, the Rev. D.C.S. van der Merwe, then based in Windhoek, was named pastor covering the entire southern area of SWA, and to that end, he began holding services in a primary school classroom in Mariental.

At a congregation meeting in Mariental on May 25, 1963, it was decided to begin raising money to build a church. The church council approached the municipality, which granted two large plots of land to build the GKSA church. The building committee included Brothers Pieter van Vuuren (chairman), Boy de Waal, Z.P. Venter, and P.J. Nel, and Sisters H.C. Venter, C. Viljoen, C. Visser, and J. Horn, along with the Rev. Benoni van der Walt, pastor at Keetmanshoop from 1963 to 1969.

Sales, collection plate drives, and even sheep farming revenues raised the needed construction fund. The building committee decided on a slightly altered version of the Karasburg church building plan. J. Notzen won the construction contract with a bid of R8,500. The church wound up costing R13,000, with pews for 120, two communion tables, and 20 chairs included. Expenses were already paid by completion. Jasper Visser built the pulpit as well as the wooden doors later damaged by burglars.

A member made the original candelabra above the pulpit from a Cobra Boot Polish can tied to the roof with a dog chain. It was later replaced after newer members complained. On the keystone, the coat of arms of the GKSA is engraved along with the words of Psalm 24:10: "Who is he, this King of glory? The Lord Almighty—he is the King of glory." In a box behind the keystone are documents identifying the building committee and church council members, the contractor, and the nature of the fundraising.

The dedication finally occurred on Saturday, November 28, 1964. Early in the 21st century, the building's west facade changed somewhat. The nursery was converted into an office and hall, and a rectory was built for the pastor alongside the church as well.

Pastors 
 Viljoen, Johannes Hendrik, 1970–1974
 Buys, Johannes Christiaan, 1974–1983
 Coetzee, Carel Nicolaas, 1984–1987 (left the ministry)
 Steyn, Jan Hendrik, 1987–1988
 Jansen van Nieuwenhuizen, Petrus Johannes, 1989–1993
 Snyman, Willem Marthinus, 1996–1998 (together with Aranos)
 Van den Heever, Werner, 2000–2002
 Briel, Hendrik Johannes, 2004–2006
 Van Dyk, Frans Johannes, 2006–2017 (together with Keetmanshoop)
 Dunn, Johan, 2017 – present (together with Keetmanshoop)

Sources 
 (af) Harris, C.T., Noëth, J.G., Sarkady, N.G., Schutte, F.M. en Van Tonder, J.M. 2010. Van seringboom tot kerkgebou: die argitektoniese erfenis van die Gereformeerde Kerke. Potchefstroom: Administratiewe Buro.
 (en) Potgieter, D.J. (chief ed.) Standard Encyclopaedia of Southern Africa. Cape Town: Nasionale Opvoedkundige Uitgewery Ltd., 1973.
 (en) Raper, P.E. 1987. Dictionary of South African Place Names. Johannesburg: Lowry Publishers.
 (af) Schalekamp, Rev. M.E. (chairman: edition commission). 2001. Die Almanak van die Gereformeerde Kerke in Suid-Afrika vir die jaar 2002. Potchefstroom: Administratiewe Buro.
 (af) Van der Walt, Dr. S.J. (chairman: almanac deputies). 1997. Die Almanak van die Gereformeerde Kerke in Suid-Afrika vir die jaar 1998. Potchefstroom: Administratiewe Buro.
 (af) Venter, Rev. A.A. (chief ed.) 1957. Almanak van die Gereformeerde Kerk in Suid-Afrika vir die jaar 1958. Potchefstroom: Administratiewe Buro.
 (af) Venter, Rev. A.A. (chief ed.) 1958. Almanak van die Gereformeerde Kerk in Suid-Afrika vir die jaar 1959. Potchefstroom: Administratiewe Buro.
 (af) Vogel, Willem (ed.). 2014. Die Almanak van die Gereformeerde Kerke in Suid-Afrika vir die jaar 2015. Potchefstroom: Administratiewe Buro.

See also 
 Reformed Churches in Namibia

Churches in Namibia
Reformed Churches in South Africa